Alyssa Bannan (born 13 April 2002) is an Australian rules footballer playing for the Melbourne Football Club in the AFL Women's competition (AFLW). She made her debut against  at Metricon Stadium in the opening round of the 2021 season.

References

External links 

 

2002 births
Living people
Melbourne Football Club (AFLW) players
Northern Knights players (NAB League Girls)
Australian rules footballers from Victoria (Australia)